Nikolaus Michael Louis Johann (Hans) von Dallwitz (29 September 1855 in Breslau, Lower Silesia – 2 August 1919 in Bosse) was a politician, who served in Anhalt and Prussia.

Biography
Having frequented the Gymnasium of Dresden, he studied law. From 1886 to 1899 he served on the administrative council of the district of Lüben, and then the council of Posen. In 1902 he became Minister of State for Anhalt and in 1901, Superior President of the province of Silesia. From 1903 to 1909 he was Minister-President of Anhalt, and from 1910 to 1914, Interior Minister of Prussia. After a conflict with his conservative colleagues, he resigned from the post (see Saverne Affair).

In 1914 Dallwitz, was chosen by Kaiser Wilhelm II as successor to Count Karl von Wedel as reichsstatthalter of Alsace-Lorraine. During this time, he attempted to join the Reichsland to Prussia. However, the outbreak of the First World War and the subsequent conflict between the populations of Alsace-Lorraine and Prussia led to the resignation of Dallwitz on 14 October 1918.

Sources
 Paul Wentzcke, Dallwitz, Hans von in Neue Deutsche Biographie (NDB), Vol. 3, Duncker & Humblot, Berlin, 1957, p. 493

1855 births
1919 deaths
Politicians from Wrocław
People from the Province of Silesia
Interior ministers of Prussia